The Rench is a right-hand tributary of the Rhine in the Ortenau (Central Baden, Germany). It rises on the southern edge of the Northern Black Forest at Kniebis near Bad Griesbach im Schwarzwald. After flowing through its steep mountainside klinge it is joined by other streams to form, first, the Old (Alter), then the Wild Rench (Wilder Rench), which first becomes the Rench below Bad Griesbach. The Rench runs in a prominent southerly arc through the Central Black Forest and crosses the hilly region of Ortenau with its orchards and vineyards before breaking out into the Rhine Plain. After just under 57 km it discharges, together with the Mühlbach, into the Rhine at 314.7 km between Helmlingen (Rheinau) and Lichtenau.

The upper Rench valley around Bad Peterstal-Griesbach initially cuts into the forested bunter sandstone plateaux before entering a more open, very rugged valley with steep relief, whose centre is the little town of Oppenau. There it is joined from the right by the Lierbach, well known for the All Saints Waterfalls.
In Lautenbach the valley broadens suddenly into the Foothill Zone with the town of Oberkirch at the foot of the vineyards and the little town of Renchen, whose environs are dominated by orchards.

The B 28 federal road, long an important transverse route across the Black Forest, runs through the Rench valley linking the Strasbourg area with the upper Neckar region. It climbs steeply above Bad Griesbach in hairpin bends to the Alexanderschanze (968 m). The Rench Valley Railway starts at Appenweier and runs as far as Bad Griesbach. It has also contributed to the development of the thermal baths in the Rench valley, which had already been established in the 16th century in Bad Griesbach, but which soon extended to Bad Antogast near Oppenau (especially for the nobility), Bad Peterstal and Bad Freiersbach (today part of Bad Peterstal-Griesbach).

The "Rench Flood Canal" was built between 1936 and 1953 at the Acher Rench Correction to divert flood waters. It branches off the Rench at Erlach, picks up the Acher Canal at Rheinau and merges with the actual Rench at Memprechtshofen.

Gallery

References

External links 

 "LUBW-BRSWEB": 
 , especially the map sections and layers
 the Landesanstalt für Umwelt, Messungen und Naturschutz Baden-Württemberg (LUBW)
 "LUBW-FG10": Rivers, 1:10,000 scale
 "LUBW-SG10": Lakes and reservoirs, 1:10,000 scale
 "LUBW-GEZG": Catchments
 Map of the Rench from source to mouth at OpenStreetMap

Rivers of Baden-Württemberg
Rivers of the Black Forest
Rivers of Germany